Oleksandr Matvyeyev (born 11 February 1989 in Poltava, Ukrainian SSR) is a professional Ukrainian footballer, who plays as a centre-back.

External links
 Official website profile (Ukr)
 
 

1989 births
Living people
Ukrainian footballers
FC Vorskla Poltava players
Ukrainian Premier League players
Sportspeople from Poltava
FC Poltava players
FC Mariupol players
FC Oleksandriya players
FC Kolos Kovalivka players
Ukraine under-21 international footballers
Association football defenders